Boyden may refer to:

Places
 Boyden Cave, a mile-long cavern located in the Giant Sequoia National Monument of the Sequoia National Forest, California, United States
 Boyden Gate, parish of Chislet, Kent, England
 Boyden–Hull High School, in Hull, Iowa, United States
 Boyden, Iowa, United States
 Boyden Library in Foxborough, Massachusetts, United States
 Boyden Observatory, South Africa
 Seth Boyden House in Foxborough, Massachusetts, United States

People with the surname
 Boyden Carpenter, American musician
 C. Boyden Gray, American attorney
 Amanda Boyden, American novelist
 David Dodge Boyden, American musicologist 
 Edward Boyden, American neuroscientist
 Elbridge Boyden, American architect 
 Frank Boyden Deerfield Academy Headmaster
 Ian Boyden, American artist
 James Boyden, British politician
 Jennifer Boyden, American poet
 John Boyden, British music industry executive
 Joseph Boyden, Canadian novelist
 Linda Boyden, American poet
 Malcolm Boyden, British radio personality
 Matthew Boyden, multiple people
 Nate Boyden, American soccer player
 Nathaniel Boyden, American politician
 Philo Boyden, American politician
 Sally Boyden (disambiguation), multiple people
 Seth Boyden, American inventor
 Uriah A. Boyden, American engineer and inventor

Other
4301 Boyden, main-belt asteroid
 Boyden Chamber, a type of chemotaxis assay